Grishino is a rural locality (a selo) and the administrative center of Grishinsky Selsoviet, Zarinsky District, Altai Krai, Russia. The population was 476 as of 2013. There are 6 streets.

Geography 
Grishino is located 18 km south of Zarinsk (the district's administrative centre) by road. Zudilovo is the nearest rural locality.

References 

Rural localities in Zarinsky District